is a commuter railway station on the Enoshima Electric Railway (Enoden) located in the Gokurakuji neighborhood of the city of Kamakura, Kanagawa Prefecture, Japan.

Lines
Gokurakuji Station is served by the Enoshima Electric Railway Main Line and is 7.6 kilometers from the terminus of the line at Fujisawa Station.

Station layout
The station consists of a single side platform serving bi-directional traffic. The station is attended.

Platforms

Lines
Gokurakuji Station is served by the Enoshima Electric Railway Line, and is 7.6 kilometers from the terminus of the Enoden at Fujisawa Station.

History 
Gokurakuji Station opened on 1 April 1904.

Station numbering was introduced to the Enoshima Electric Railway January 2014 with Gokurakuji being assigned station number EN11.

Passenger statistics
In fiscal 2019, the station was used by an average of 1,764 passengers daily, making it the 13th used of the 15 Enoden stations 

The average passenger figures for previous years (boarding passengers only) are as shown below.

Surrounding area
Gokuraku-ji Temple
Gokurakuji Pass

Appearance in popular media
Gokurakuji Station was featured in the 2015 movie, "Our Little Sister" (Umimachi Diary) and in the early 2000s anime "Elfen Lied", by Lynn Okamoto. It was also featured in every episode of a popular Fuji TV television series, "Second to Last Love" (最後から二番目の恋, “Saigo Kara Nibanme no Koi”) directed by Rieko Miyamoto, two seasons of which aired in 2012 and 2014. It is also the setting of the manga "Minami Kamakura High School Girls Cycling Club" which was serialized from 2011 to 2018.  The station also appeared in the full version of the music video for the 2011 AKB48 song Kimi no Senaka.

See also
 List of railway stations in Japan

References

External links

Enoden station information 

Railway stations in Kanagawa Prefecture
Railway stations in Japan opened in 1904
Kamakura, Kanagawa